Seticosta transtillana is a species of moth of the family Tortricidae. It is found in Peru.

The wingspan is 18 mm. The ground colour of the forewings is cream white with fasciae suffused brownish medially with whiter edges. The hindwings are pale brownish grey with darker diffuse strigulation (fine streaks) and more cream towards the base.

Etymology
The species name refers to the peculiar shape of the transtilla.

References

Moths described in 2010
Seticosta